"Living on an Island" is a single released by the British rock band Status Quo in 1979. It was included on the album Whatever You Want and featured Rick Parfitt on lead vocals. 

Lyrically, the song is about band member Rick Parfitt having to take a "tax year" outside of the United Kingdom and the boredom and isolation he felt living on the Isle of Jersey; however he is also excited about a pending visit from a friend ("Cruxie") who is arriving shortly.

-The first verse deals with fame and the public's perception v. the reality and the resulting depression, due to loneliness.

-The second verse is more optimistic, with Parfitt, not sounding depressed, but bored. 

-The third verse however, is positive; talking about the fun the two men are currently having. Although the storyteller indicates that he knows that this will be short lived, as his friend won't stay long. 

The themes of the song are isolation, friendship, partying and drugs, specifically cocaine. Every verse ends with the 'line' (also referenced multiple times and further proof of drug theme) "and we'll get high". Despite the very obvious drug references, the single doesn't appear to have been banned by the BBC and became a top 20 hit single in the UK; making it to no. 16.

As with the 'penguin' theme started with the previous "Whatever You Want" single, the first 100,000 copies of "Living on an Island" were issued with a picture sleeve featuring several penguins enjoying Antarctic conditions. In addition, the music video features footage of penguins interspersed with footage of the band miming the song on a soundstage.

Track listing 
 "Living on an Island" (Parfitt/Young) (3.47)
 "Runaway" (Rossi/Frost) (4.32)

Charts

References 

Status Quo (band) songs
1979 singles
Songs written by Rick Parfitt
Songs written by Bob Young (musician)